Abdou Kareem Savage was the chief justice of Gambia from 22 February 2006 till 8 June 2009. He was preceded by Stephen Alan Brobbey and succeeded by Akomaye Agim.

References 

20th-century Gambian lawyers
Chief justices of the Gambia
Living people
Year of birth missing (living people)
Oku people
21st-century Gambian judges